Garin Rural District is a rural district (dehestan) in Zarrin Dasht District, Nahavand County, Hamadan Province, Iran. At the 2006 census, its population was 7,438, in 1,829 families. The rural district has 7 villages.

References 

Rural Districts of Hamadan Province
Nahavand County